, also known by the Chinese-style name , was a bureaucrat of the Ryukyu Kingdom.

Ryōchū was born to an aristocrat family called Ba-uji Oroku Dunchi. He was the 12th head of Oroku Dunchi, and his father Oroku Ryōkyō, was a Sanshikan during Shō Iku's reign.

Oroku Ryōchū was selected as a member of Sanshikan in 1857. He was pro-Japanese, and was a political ally of Makishi Chōchū and Onga Chōkō (also known as Shō Jorin ). However, Zakimi Seifu, a former Sanshikan who was impeached by Onga Chōkō and had to resign before, accused Makishi Chōchū of practice bribery at election. Soon Oroku's unlawful act was exposed, he was removed from his position and arrested together with Makishi Chōchū and Onga Chōkō. Prince Ie was appointed as judge to interrogate them. Oroku denied all the allegations but Makishi pleaded guilty. Oroku was exiled to Ie Island and imprisoned at a temple for 500 days, while Makishi was sentenced to exile to Yaeyama for ten years and Onga to Kume Island for six years, respectively.

References

1819 births
Ueekata
Sanshikan
People of the Ryukyu Kingdom
Ryukyuan people
19th-century Ryukyuan people
Year of death missing